Westlinton is a civil parish in the Carlisle district of Cumbria, England.  It contains eight listed buildings that are recorded in the National Heritage List for England.  All the listed buildings are designated at Grade II, the lowest of the three grades, which is applied to "buildings of national importance and special interest".  The parish include the villages of Westlinton and Blackford, and is otherwise rural.  The listed buildings include farmhouses, a house with outbuildings, two milestones, a bridge, and a church.


Buildings

Notes and references

Notes

Citations

Sources

Lists of listed buildings in Cumbria